Mohd Shaid Rosli is a Malaysian politician who has served as Member of the Selangor State Legislative Assembly (MLA) for Jeram since May 2018. He is a member of the Homeland Fighters Party (PEJUANG) and was a member of the Malaysian United Indigenous Party (BERSATU), a component party of the federal ruling but state opposition Perikatan Nasional (PN) coalition and formerly Pakatan Harapan (PH) state ruling but federal opposition coalition.

Political career 
Mohd Shaid initially contested for Jeram state seat of Selangor in 2018 Selangor state election representing BERSATU and PH. He went on to win the state by defeating two opponents Zahar Azlan Ariffin from Barisan Nasional (BN) and United Malays National Organisation (UMNO) and Mohd Noor Mohd Shahar from Malaysian Islamic Party (PAS) with a total of 7,087 votes and a majority of 1,191 votes.

On 8 August 2020, he left BERSATU and PN and declared that he would choose to work together with the former Prime Minister and former BERSATU Chairman Mahathir Mohamad who was expelled from BERSATU due to political differences with then Prime Minister Muhyiddin Yassin and BERSATU President who brought BERSATU out of PH and formed PN government as Mahathir opposed PN government by joining PEJUANG.

Election results

References

External links 
 

Selangor politicians
Members of the Selangor State Legislative Assembly
Living people
Malaysian Muslims
Former Malaysian United Indigenous Party politicians
Year of birth missing (living people)